Abdelmajid Ben Belgacem (born 4 February 1986) is a retired Tunisian football striker.

References

1986 births
Living people
Tunisian footballers
Tunisia international footballers
US Monastir (football) players
ES Hammam-Sousse players
Association football forwards
Tunisian Ligue Professionnelle 1 players